The Video Technology CreatiVision is a hybrid computer and home video game console introduced by VTech in 1981 and released in 1982 during the Second generation of video game consoles. It was built by the Finnish company Salora. It cost $295 Australian Dollars. The hybrid unit was similar in concept to computers such as the APF Imagination Machine, the older VideoBrain Family Computer, and to a lesser extent the Intellivision game console and Coleco Adam computer, all of which anticipated the trend of video game consoles becoming more like low-end computers. It was discontinue in 1986.

History
The CreatiVision was distributed in many European countries, including most German-speaking countries like West Germany, Austria and Switzerland and also Italy, South Africa, in Israel under the Educat 2002 name, as well as in Australia and New Zealand under the Dick Smith Wizzard name. Other names for the system (all officially produced by VTech themselves) include the FunVision Computer Video Games System, Hanimex Rameses (both released in Australia and New Zealand) and VZ 2000 (planned for release in France, likely unreleased). All CreatiVision and similar clones were designed for use with PAL standard television sets, except the Japanese CreatiVision (distributed by Cheryco) which was NTSC and is nowadays much sought after by collectors. However, the US release was planned but never sold efficiently.

The CreatiVision console sported an 8-bit Rockwell 6502 CPU at a speed of 2 MHz, 1KB of RAM and 16KB of Video RAM, and had a graphics resolution of 256 × 192 with 16 colors and 32 sprites. The console had two integrated joystick/membrane keypad controllers (much like the ColecoVision and Atari 5200) which, when set in a special compartment on top of the console, could be used as a computer keyboard. The CreatiVision had interfaces for a cassette player, an extra rubber keyboard, parallel I/O interface, floppy disk drive and modem (likely unreleased) and one memory expansion module for use with the Basic language cartridge. Any Centronics-compatible printer could be connected to the I/O module if present.

The CreatiVision was discontinued in late 1985/early 1986.

A computer was produced by VTech in 1984-1986, based on CreatiVision hardware and was compatible with most of its games: Laser 2001, which is also sold in West Germany and was brought to France.
It was also available in Finland through Salora, with the name of Manager. The Manager had a Finnish keyboard layout and character set.

A module allowing to play ColecoVision games were designed for use with the CreatiVision Mark-2 model (a later revision of the 1st model, incorporating hardware changes specifically designed to make the Coleco-module work). Before being produced, the module was modified internally and released for use on the Laser 2001 and Salora computers only. A special adaptor (homebrew) would be needed to make the Coleco-module work on the CreatiVision Mark-2.

List of games

In some regions, the console and its games were distributed by different companies, such as Cheryco in Japan, and Hanimex in Australia. VTech reissued several previous existing games in 1985.

There were  titles known to have been released.

Notes

References

External links

 CreatiVEmu: CreatiVision Emulation Central
 Creativision Datasette Interface
 
 Video Game Console Library database entry
 20th Century Retro Games entry (Gallery page for many VTech CreatiVision models and regional variants.)
 Retrospective: A Tale Of Dick Smith’s Wizzard (AUSRETROGAMER E-Zine. May 9, 2016 By Aaron Clement.)

Home video game consoles
Second-generation video game consoles
Products introduced in 1981
VTech
65xx-based video game consoles